Ahnsbeck is a municipality in the district of Celle, in Lower Saxony, Germany. It is situated at the southern border of the Lüneburg Heath, 10 km eastern of the city of Celle. It is part of the collective municipality of Lachendorf.

History
The Village of Ahnsbeck is first mentioned in the 13th century under the name of "Alrebekesa", meaning Floodplain of the Alder-stream, which also reflects in the coat of arms.

Until 31 December 2004 Ahnsbeck belonged to the Regierungsbezirk (government region) Lüneburg.

References

Celle (district)